Pryluky's Ivanivska Church is an Orthodox diocese temple in the district center of Pryluky within the Chernihiv Oblast; it is a historical and architectural monument from the middle of the 19th century.

The temple is located on the corner of Kyiv and Ivanovo streets.

History
In the years 1708-09 Pryluky Colonel Dmitry Gorlenko, at his own expense, built a wooden church of St. John the Dmitrov in honor of saints - the patrons of Ivan Mazepa and his own. It was located near the gate of the Kiev office Kvashyntsi pasture. This temple existed for almost 70 years, and in 1780 in its place was built a new church, also in the name of John the Baptist and St. Dmitry. However the church was demolished in the middle of the 19th century, but there in its place was built a small chapel.

New (modern) stone churches of St. John the Baptist and the throne icon of the Mother of God Troyeruchnytsi built at a new location - at the intersection of Kyiv and Ivanovo streets. August 28, 1865 its solemn consecration.

Initially the five-domed church and the three-tiered bell tower stood separately, but in 1910 it was merged with an annex, which helped almost double the area of worship.

In the courtyard of the Ivanivska Church, near the street, in 1893 built a chapel dedicated to the family of Emperor Alexander III ( «in memory of the miraculous release of October 17, 1887" during a train accident).

In February 1930 the Ivanivska Church was closed, crosses and bells removed and the premises of worship transformed into a military warehouses for 224th Infantry Regiment, based in Pryluky. Later the church became a gloves and mitten factory for fire protection, and in 1964 - the composition of urban management of trade.

In 1993 the Ivanivska Church was given to the faithful of the Orthodox Church of the Moscow Patriarchate.

In the years between 1996-2001 the Ivanivska Church was fully restored and on January 22, 2001 it was consecrated.

Gallery

Further reading
Іванівська церква // Прилуччина: Енциклопедичний довідник, Ніжин: «Аспект-Поліграф», 2007, — с. 189—190

Buildings and structures in Chernihiv Oblast
Churches in Ukraine